Telebimbi is a Canadian Category B-exempt Italian language specialty channel owned by TLN Media Group. Telebimbi broadcasts programming primarily aimed at children in addition to select family-oriented programming.

History
In October 2011, TLN Media Group, at the time a consortium majority owned by Corus Entertainment, was granted approval from the Canadian Radio-television and Telecommunications Commission (CRTC) to launch a television channel called All Italian Children’s Television, described as "a national, niche third-language ethnic specialty Category B service devoted to providing programming to Canadians with origins in Italy or who are of Italian descent, and who are from preschool age to seventeen years of age.

The channel launched on December 4, 2014 as Telebimbi, exclusively on Bell Fibe TV.  On May 31, 2016, Telebimbi launched on Cogeco. On August 31, 2017, Telebimbi launched on Rogers.

As of February 11, 2019, it and sister channel TeleNiños have operated under exempt status. Shortly after, Corus sold its stake in Telelatino Network to the other co-owners.

Programming
Telebimbi broadcasts programming for kids of all ages, as well as family-oriented programming.

Program list 
The Adventures of Paddington Bear
Are You Afraid of the Dark?
The Busy World of Richard Scarry
The Country Mouse and the City Mouse Adventures
Caillou
Mumble Bumble
Sherlock Holmes in the 22nd Century
The Wacky World of Tex Avery
Where on Earth Is Carmen Sandiego?
''Rolie Polie Olie

References

External links

Children's television networks in Canada
Digital cable television networks in Canada
Multicultural and ethnic television in Canada
Television channels and stations established in 2014
2014 establishments in Canada
Italian-language television stations